Shedrack Chukwu Ogbogu is a Riverian politician from Ogba–Egbema–Ndoni. In 2015, Chukwu was appointed as Commissioner of the Ministry of Energy and Natural Resources, a position he held until 2017 when reappointed as Commissioner of the Ministry of Power.

References

Living people
Commissioners of ministries of Rivers State
People from Ogba–Egbema–Ndoni
First Wike Executive Council
Rivers State politicians
Energy ministers
Rivers State Commissioners of Energy and Natural Resources
Year of birth missing (living people)